Ramaperta telemaca is a species of moth of the family Tortricidae. It is found in Brazil (Parana).

The wingspan is about 10 mm. The ground colour of the forewings is cream with pale brownish yellow markings. The hindwings are pale brownish grey.

Etymology
The specific name refers to the type locality.

References

Moths described in 2011
Euliini